Jayson Paul Durocher (born August 18, 1974) is an American former professional baseball pitcher who played for the Milwaukee Brewers of  Major League Baseball (MLB). He played in a total of 45 MLB games, during the 2002 and 2003 seasons.

References

External links

1974 births
Living people
Albany Polecats players
American expatriate baseball players in Canada
Arizona League Brewers players
Baseball players from Hartford, Connecticut
Gulf Coast Expos players
Harrisburg Senators players
Indianapolis Indians players
Jupiter Hammerheads players
Las Vegas Stars (baseball) players
Major League Baseball pitchers
Milwaukee Brewers players
Mobile BayBears players
Oklahoma RedHawks players
Ottawa Lynx players
Tulsa Drillers players
Vermont Expos players
West Palm Beach Expos players